Sheena Watt is an Australian politician, who has been a member of the Victorian Legislative Council for Northern Metropolitan Region since 13 October 2020. A Yorta Yorta woman, she is the first Indigenous Australian woman to represent the Australian Labor Party in the Parliament of Victoria.

Watt is a member of the Labor Left faction of the Labor Party.

References

1980s births
Living people
Members of the Victorian Legislative Council
Australian Labor Party members of the Parliament of Victoria
Labor Left politicians
Indigenous Australian politicians
Politicians from Melbourne
21st-century Australian politicians
21st-century Australian women politicians